"It's the Falling in Love" is a song by American recording artist Michael Jackson with guest vocals by R&B singer–songwriter Patti Austin. It is the ninth track from his fifth studio album, Off the Wall (1979). It was written by Carole Bayer Sager and David Foster, with production by Quincy Jones.

Bayer Sager first recorded the song for her album ...Too in 1978, featuring background vocals by Michael McDonald and Bill Champlin.

The version of the song by Dee Dee Bridgewater is included on her 1979 album Bad for Me. Bee Gees protégé Samantha Sang also released a version of this song in 1979, which is now available only in Australia on her album The Ultimate Collection. Dionne Warwick also recorded the song for her 1980 album No Night So Long.

Personnel
Personnel as listed in the album's liner notes are:

 Patti Austin – lead vocals, background vocals
 Tom Bahler  – vocal arrangement
 David Foster – synthesizer, rhythm arrangement
 Gary Grant – trumpet
 Marlo Henderson – guitar
 Jerry Hey – horn arrangements, trumpet, flugelhorn
 Kim Hutchcroft – baritone saxophone, tenor saxophone, flute
 Michael Jackson – lead vocals, background vocals
 Louis Johnson – bass guitar
 Quincy Jones – producer, rhythm arrangements, vocal arrangements
 Greg Phillinganes – piano, Fender Rhodes
 Steve Porcaro – synthesizer, programming
 Bill Reichenbach Jr. – trombone
 John Robinson – drums
 The Seawind Horns  – horns
 Bruce Swedien –  recording engineer, audio mixer
 Wah Wah Watson – guitar
 Larry Williams – tenor saxophone, alto saxophone, flute

Adaptations
In 1979, Japanese singer Miki Matsubara released "Mayonaka no Door (Stay with Me)," her debut single. While likely unknown outside Japan at the time, it experienced a resurgence in popularity around the world in 2020. Its musical arrangement and defining riffs are very similar to "It's the Falling in Love," though the lyrics differ completely.
In 2005, It's the Falling in Love was sampled on So Solid Crew member DJ Swiss's single "Cry", from the album Pain 'n' Muziq.
In 2008, British DJ Louis La Roche's 2008 song "Love" from the EP The Peach.
In 2020, H.E.R.'s "We Made It" sampled Carole Bayer Sager's original version on her debut album, Back of My Mind.

References

Michael Jackson songs
1979 songs
Song recordings produced by Quincy Jones
Songs written by Carole Bayer Sager
Songs written by David Foster